The Groton Inn is an inn at 128 Main Street in Groton, Massachusetts.  Until 2011, it was an inn consisting of three historic structures, and was believed to be the oldest operating inn in the nation. The oldest structure was complete in 1678, making the inn the oldest in the United States. From 1797 until 1847 the inn served as a meeting place for St. Paul's Masonic Lodge, where Paul Revere was Grand Master. The building was added to the National Register of Historic Places in 1976.  The inn was severely damaged by fire in August 2011. Attempts were made to save the front of the building, which was barely harmed compared to the rest of the structure, but the owners chose to demolish the inn in November 2011.

Local investors and residents proposed rebuilding the inn, and in 2017 construction began. Completed in April 2018, the inn is now a 60-room boutique hotel.

See also
National Register of Historic Places listings in Middlesex County, Massachusetts

References

External links
Official web site

Hotel buildings on the National Register of Historic Places in Massachusetts
Buildings and structures in Groton, Massachusetts
Hotel buildings completed in the 17th century
Burned hotels in the United States
National Register of Historic Places in Middlesex County, Massachusetts
1678 establishments in Massachusetts
Buildings and structures completed in 1678